The Great Synagogue of Łódź (Polish: Wielka Synagoga w Łodzi) was a synagogue in Łódź, Poland, which was built in 1881. It was designed by Adolf Wolff and paid mostly by local industrialists, such as Izrael Poznański, Joachim Silberstein and Karol Scheibler.

It served the reformed congregation and was usually referred to as The Temple.

Prominent Łódż builder and architect Johann Steck (or, Jan Sztek, 1851–1914) carried out construction of the Great Synagogue in 1881–1887, at the corner of ul. Zielona and al. Tadeusza Kościuszki (formerly ul. Spacerowa).

The synagogue was burned to the ground by the Germans on the night of November 14, 1939, along with its Torah scrolls and interior fixtures. It was dismantled in 1940. Today the site is used as a parking lot.

See also
 Stara Synagogue, Łódź
 Ezras Israel Synagogue

Gallery

References

Synagogues in Łódź
Synagogues completed in 1881
Synagogues in Poland destroyed by Nazi Germany
Former Reform synagogues in Poland
Synagogue buildings with domes
Romanesque Revival synagogues
19th-century religious buildings and structures in Poland